Francis Daniel Barzilauskas (June 13, 1920 – November 30, 1990) was an American football guard who played four seasons in the National Football League (NFL) with the Boston Yanks/New York Bulldogs and New York Giants. He was drafted by the Yanks with the third overall pick in the 1947 NFL Draft. He first enrolled at the College of the Holy Cross before transferring to Yale University. Barzilauskas attended Crosby High School in Waterbury, Connecticut. He served in the United States Air Force during World War II. He was the uncle of Carl Barzilauskas.

References

External links
Just Sports Stats

1920 births
1990 deaths
American football guards
American people of Lithuanian descent
Holy Cross Crusaders football players
Boston Yanks players
New York Bulldogs players
New York Giants players
People from Hamden, Connecticut
Sportspeople from Waterbury, Connecticut
Players of American football from Connecticut
United States Air Force officers
United States Army Air Forces pilots of World War II
Yale Bulldogs football players